le.com, formerly known as LeTV, is Chinese video hosting website started in 2004.In 2012, LeTV produced the first web series, Once Upon a Time in Northwest：20 Years in Gangs，which later is banned by the country due to its violent content. Go Princess Go is one of the most popular shows produced by Le.

Original programmings

Drama

References 

Lists of television series by network
Le